Municipal elections were held in the Canadian province of Nova Scotia on October 17, 2020. Here is a summary of the mayoral results in the largest municipalities in the province and the council results for Cape Breton and Kings County (for Halifax, see 2020 Halifax municipal election). Elections were also held for the Conseil scolaire acadien provincial school board.

Amherst

Plebiscite

Bridgewater

Cape Breton Regional Municipality

Mayor
Challenging incumbent mayor Cecil Clarke are District 8 councillor Amanda McDougall, businessman Kevin MacEachern, 1990 Sydney mayoral candidate Chris Abbass, former Sydney Steel president John Strasser, and Archie MacKinnon who ran as an Independent candidate in the 2019 Canadian federal election in Sydney—Victoria.

Cape Breton Regional Council

Colchester County

Cumberland County
Cumberland County will be directly electing a mayor for the first time in 2020.

District of Chester

Halifax

Kentville

Kings County

Kings County Municipal Council

District of the Municipality of Lunenburg

Lunenburg (Town)

New Glasgow

Region of Queens Municipality

Truro

West Hants Regional Municipality
Prior to the District of West Hant's amalgamation with Windsor on April 1, 2020, the new West Hants Regional Municipality held elections on March 7, 2020. The new municipality will therefore not hold elections in October.

Mayoral results:

Yarmouth (Town)

References

2020
Nova Scotia, municipal
Municipal elections
Nova Scotia municipal elections